Walfordite is a very rare tellurite mineral that was discovered in Chile in 1999.  The mineral is described as orange with orange-yellow streak, and is determined to have a chemical formula of Fe3+,Te6+Te4+3O8 with minor titanium and magnesium substitution resulting in an approximate empirical formula of (Fe3+,Te6+,Ti4+,Mg)(Te4+)3O8.

Occurrence
The only reported occurrence is in the Wendy open pit, El Indio-Tambo mining district of the Coquimbo Region, northern Chile where it occurs in oxidized breccia associated with a tellurium-bearing gold deposit. Associated minerals include: alunite, rodalquilarite, native gold, emmonsite, jarosite and pyrite. The mineral was named for mine geologist Phillip Walford (1945— ) who first noted the mineral.

See also
El Indio Gold Belt. Tambo is adjacent to the El Indio mine. Both are now closed.

References

Tellurite and selenite minerals
Oxide minerals
Cubic minerals
Minerals in space group 206